The Licence Raj or Permit Raj (rāj, meaning "rule" in Hindi) is a pejorative for the system of strict government control and regulation of the Indian economy that was in place from the 1950s to the early 1990s. Under this system, businesses in India were required to obtain licenses from the government in order to operate, and these licenses were often difficult to obtain. 

The License Raj was intended to protect Indian industry and promote self-reliance and ensure regional equality.

Up to 80 government agencies had to be satisfied before private companies could produce something and, if granted, the government would regulate production. 

The term "Licence Raj" is a play on the "British Raj" which refers to the period of British rule in India. It was coined by Indian independence activist and statesman Chakravarti Rajagopalachari, who was strongly opposed to the system of strict government control and regulation of the economy that it represented. Rajagopalachari believed that the Licence Raj had the potential for political corruption and economic stagnation, and founded the Swatantra Party to oppose these practices.

Reforms started in 1991 have significantly reduced regulation, However, Indian labor laws continue to protect workers in the formal sector from being laid off by employers and place significant restrictions on the ability of businesses to reduce their workforce without incurring significant costs and burdens.This is viewed by some as a barrier to economic growth and development as it may create a disincentive for businesses to hire workers and can make it difficult for them to respond to changing market conditions or economic challenges.

History

Following the Russian Revolution, socialist thinkers in India began drawing parallels between the pre-revolution Russian proletariat and the Indian masses under colonial rule, seeing socialism as a way to empower poor Indian farmers. Following Indian independence these socialist factions, most importantly Jawaharlal Nehru's conception of democratic socialism, influenced the policies of the License Raj. 

Nehru studied at Trinity College, Cambridge and was exposed to socialist ideas during his time there. He also visited the Soviet Union in 1927, and this experience may have further influenced his views on socialism. However, Nehru's own political views and the policies he implemented as Prime Minister were often more pragmatic and centrist than strictly socialist. He believed in the need for a strong, centralized government and a planned economy, but he also recognized the importance of private enterprise and the market in driving economic growth and development. Nehru also believed that protecting domestic industries would help to promote industrialization and economic development in India, and he implemented a number of protectionist policies during his time in office.

He saw such government intervention as a way to modernize the Indian economy which had been left impoverished by decades of colonial rule. However, Nehru did not seek to eliminate the private sector entirely, as was the case in the Soviet Union. Rather, he pursued a policy of creating a mixed economy in India, with strategic industries under state control and public sector corporations guiding investment, while also allowing for a significant role for the private sector and market forces.. 

The economic centralization and controls required for the war effort during World War II helped create the bureaucratic and manufacturing infrastructure necessary to institute Nehru's plans, and so following independence and his election as prime minister, he had the opportunity to put his ideas into action. In his speech to the Constituent Assembly of India, he declared, "The service of India means the service of the millions who suffer. It means the ending of poverty and ignorance and disease and inequality of opportunity."

By the late 1950s, the Swatantra Party, the country's first market-friendly political party, had formed in opposition to Nehru's policies. This party, which was made up of ex-landlords, businessmen, and rich peasants, argued that Nehru's centralized economic policies were incompatible with democracy. In a memorandum to party officials, they claimed that "the best guarantee of speed in progress is a maximum of individual freedom and a minimum of governmental interference." They argued that Nehru's policies were stifling individual initiative and freedom and slowing economic progress. 

Chakravarti Rajagopalachari, a founder of the Swatantra Party, coined the term “Permit-License Raj” to encapsulate the party's frustrations with Nehru's policies, writing in his right-wing magazine Swarajya:

Characteristics 
A key characteristic of the Licence Raj was a Planning Commission that centrally administered the economy of the country. Like a command economy, India had Five-Year Plans on the lines of the five-year plans in the Soviet Union. However, unlike Soviet Union, private sector also played a significant role. The Planning Commission was set up in 1950 to survey the available resources in the country and formulate plans to raise the standard of living. 

Planning Commission enacted the First Five Year Plan in 1951, aimed at developing the agricultural sector amid severe food shortages and an influx of refugees from the Partition, and that plan led to a 4% increase in GDP, higher than the projected 2%. Nehru's government hoped to build on the success of the First Five Year Plan with their more ambitious Second Five Year Plan aimed at continuing agricultural and infrastructure investment while developing heavy industry and increasing employment. But this plan failed to reach its goal of 5% growth and the heavy spending in the plan depleted the country's foreign currency reserves as the country did not have sufficient domestic resources to fund these projects and therefore had to rely on imported capital and technology.

Another main characteristic of the License Raj was heavy regulation on industry. Legislation to regulate industry started with the Industrial Development Regulation Act of 1951, which laid out licensing restrictions on industries it designated as Schedule I which included industrial machinery, telecommunications, and chemical manufacturing. Next, the Industrial Policy Resolution of 1956 extended these restrictions by designating certain industries known as Schedule A to be exclusively under state control, and certain other industries under Schedule B to be majority state-owned. Industries in Schedule A included defense production, metallurgy, mining, and transportation.

During the 1960s, the Indian banking sector came under criticism for being controlled by a few big industrialists in large cities, and thus failing to meet the needs of rural Indians and small-scale industry. In response, the government of Indira Gandhi began pursuing "social control" of banking institutions, with Deputy Prime Minister Morarji Desai spearheading the Banking Laws (Amendment) Bill in 1968 to regulate the commercial banks' leadership. The bill stipulated that at least 51% of the directors should not be directly connected monopolies and big business, that industrialist chairmen had to be replaced by professional bankers, and that banks could not form relationships with companies tied to their own directors. Additionally, Desai forged the National Credit Council (NCC) to regulate credit allocations in order to bring more credit to rural areas and small industry. However, many of these changes were rendered moot when Indira Gandhi decided to fully nationalize 14 major banks in 1969, with 6 additional banks coming under state control in 1980.

Indian capital controls started as wartime restrictions imposed by the British on cross-border transactions during World War II, eventually growing into a complex framework of restrictions on the current account and capital account. After independence the Indian government introduced restrictions on the flow of foreign exchange reserves, and following a balance of payments crisis from 1956-1957, the government became more concerned with carefully allocating foreign exchange between different sectors of the economy. After a failed attempt at liberalization in 1966, the Foreign Investments Board was established in 1968 to scrutinize companies investing in India with more than 40% foreign equity participation. Foreign investment that did not involve technology transfers was severely restricted, and foreign collaboration with local companies was conditioned on export quotas. This tight control over foreign investment became a core part of a broader policy of import substitution industrialisation, the belief that countries like India needed to rely on internal markets for development, not international trade. To achieve this goal, the Indian government erected strict import restrictions and a complex system of tariffs that featured high rates which varied by industry.

One consequence of the License Raj was that it benefited large corporations at the expense of smaller businesses. Because large corporations were often better able to navigate the complex bureaucracy of the License Raj and secure the necessary licenses, they were able to dominate many sectors of the economy. This made it difficult for small businesses to compete, and contributed to a concentration of economic power in the hands of a few large corporations.

Another criticism of the licensing system in India was that it was prone to corruption, as businesses and individuals had to navigate a complex bureaucracy in order to obtain licenses and permissions, and may have had to pay bribes or engage in other forms of corruption in order to obtain the necessary approvals.This corruption was fueled by a broader environment of corruption in India, which was characterized by a lack of transparency and accountability in the government, a weak legal system, and a culture of corruption that had been allowed to persist for many years.

Fall of the License Raj

The Licence Raj system was in place for four decades. Many members of the Congress party, including Prime Minister P.V. Narasimha Rao and Finance Minister Manmohan Singh, were strong supporters of liberalization and played key roles in implementing these changes. In 1991, Prime Minister P. V. Narasimha Rao, who was also the Minister of Industries, initiated a policy of liberalization in India. This policy aimed to reduce government intervention in the economy and promote market-based solutions to economic problems.

The Licence Raj was believed by some to be hindering economic growth and preventing the Indian economy from reaching its full potential. This belief was based on the idea that the government's heavy intervention in the market was stifling economic activity and hampering the ability of the economy to grow and develop. 

Liberalisation resulted in substantial growth in the Indian economy, which continues today. The Licence Raj is considered to have been significantly reduced in 1991 when India had only two weeks of foreign reserves left. In return for an IMF bailout, India transferred gold bullion to London as collateral, devalued the Rupee, and accepted economic reforms. The federal government, with Manmohan Singh as finance minister, reduced licensing regulations; lowered tariffs, duties and taxes; and opened up to international trade and investment.

The reform policies introduced after 1991 removed many economic restrictions. Industrial licensing was abolished for almost all product categories, except for alcohol, tobacco, hazardous chemicals, industrial explosives, electronics, aerospace and pharmaceuticals.

Arguing that the Planning Commission had outlived its utility, Modi government disbanded it in 2014. On 6 August 2014 the Indian Parliament raised the limit on foreign direct investment in the defence sector to 49% and removed the limit for certain classes of infrastructure projects: high speed railways, including construction, operation and maintenance of high-speed train projects; suburban corridor projects through PPP; dedicated freight lines; rolling stock including train sets; locomotives manufacturing and maintenance facilities; railway electrification and signalling systems; freight terminals and passenger terminals; infrastructure in industrial park pertaining to railway line, and mass rapid transport systems.

Consequences of the fall of License Raj 
The fall of the License Raj and the implementation of economic liberalization policies may have contributed to increased regional inequality in India. Some experts argue that these policies benefited certain regions of the country, such as the major cities and industrial centers, at the expense of others, leading to a widening gap between rural and urban areas.

It may have contributed to mass migration from rural areas to cities, as people sought to take advantage of new economic opportunities and improved living standards in urban areas. This mass migration can place a burden on cities, as they may struggle to accommodate the influx of new residents and provide them with adequate housing, education, and other basic services.Slums in India are a common sight in many cities and are often found in areas that are vulnerable to flooding or other natural disasters. They are often home to marginalized communities, including migrant workers, informal sector workers, and other groups that may be excluded from mainstream society.

The scaling back of public sector enterprises may also have led to a reduction in the ability of the government to direct investment and resources towards priority areas and to protect the interests of workers, minorities and other stakeholders.

See also
 Economic history of India
 Mafia Raj
 Planned economy
 Socialism in India
 Swadeshi movement

References

Political corruption in India
Economic history of India (1947–present)
Legal history of India
Licenses
Political history of India
Bureaucratic organization
1990 in Indian economy
Planned Economies
Mixed economies